The 1978 WANFL season was the 94th season of the Western Australian National Football League in its various incarnations, and the second-last under that moniker.

In many respects this season proved the end of an era before the power balance in the WA(N)FL would drastically alter. Although apart from an almost rainless August less dry than the previous two seasons, 1978 saw numerous high-scoring records broken owing to the introduction from the eighth round of the interchange bench (initially called “switch-play”) allowing players to be rotated and create a much faster game than possible when substituted players could not be returned to play. The average score of 113.92 points per team per game was four points higher than the previous record of 1977.

Tailenders Subiaco and Swan Districts were trying desperately to win and avoid the wooden spoon, whilst powerhouses West Perth and East Perth battled with Claremont and South Fremantle for the last three places in the four. A near-record attendance at Leederville saw East Perth, who had won only six of their first fourteen matches, miraculously take the double chance after having been out of the four for almost the entire season as the Tigers and Bulldogs lost.

The finals continued the brilliant performance by East Perth to win by nineteen goals in the preliminary and then the Royals upset frontrunners Perth in a game where the weather seemed to change several times a quarter from sunny to torrential downpours.

Home-and-away season

Round 1 (Easter weekend)

Round 2

Round 3

Round 4

Round 5

Round 6

Round 7

Round 8

Round 9

Round 10

Round 11 (Foundation Day)

Round 12

Round 13

Round 14

Round 15

Round 16

Round 17

Round 18

Round 19

Round 20

Round 21

Ladder

Finals

First semi-final

Second semi-final

Preliminary final

Grand final

Notes
Held by Bob Johnson in the 1962 Preliminary Final and Eric Gorman in the 1963 Grand Final, and subsequently broken by Darren Bennett in the 1986 Second Semi and Warren Ralph in the corresponding match of 1987.

References

External links
Official WAFL website
Western Australian National Football League (WANFL), 1978

West Australian Football League seasons
WANFL